Saraswoti may refer to:

Sarasvati River
Saraswoti, Nepal